Sello "Chicco" Twala (born 5 June 1963) is a South African musician and producer who has collaborated with many well known artists in the music industry, including Nkosana Kodi and Brenda Fassie. He has created some of South Africa's hit songs. In the 1970s he played in soul bands including Umoja, Sipho "Hotstix" Mabuse's Harari, and formed his own band, Image.

Early life
Twala was born in Soweto, Johannesburg. He is a famous South African musician and music producer. Twala attended Bopasanatla High School.

Career
Twala's first triple platinum release in 1987 was a record that included the song "We Miss You Manelo", a reference to Nelson Mandela who was still a prisoner on Robben Island at the time. The song Too Late for Mama, produced by Twala and sung by Brenda Fassie, also achieved platinum status.

He was well known in the 1980s for his African pop and disco music.

His soul ballad "Peace Song", was recorded by a South African cast in 1992, just before the nation's first democratic election. Some of his songs feature in Disney's Lion king II. He collaborated with poet Mzwakhe Mbuli on the 1990 hit song "Papa Stop The War". Twala also wrote songs for and produced the album Memeza, for a comeback by the late Brenda Fassie.

Some of Twala's songs feature in Walt Disney's Lion King II. Grassroots musical talent is developed through his studios in Soweto. He has been awarded the Lifetime Achievement South African Music Award. and a Metro FM Music Award.

Twala's Modjadji was also one of the official soundtracks of the British comedy ''"The Brothers Grimsby", a movie released in 2016.

References 

1963 births
Living people
South African musicians
South African record producers